Pir Bukhsh was the son of Miran Bakhsh Mughal and was a direct descendant of Abdurashid Khan, who was khan of Yarkand and Khotan (Mughlistan) from 1533 to 1560. Pir Bukhsh had three sons: Fateh Muhammad, Lal Din and Ghulam Rasool Gangi.

Genealogy

References

Uyghurs

16th-century Asian people